And Finally: Matters of Life and Death is a 2023 memoir by Henry Marsh. It was published by Jonathan Cape on September 1, 2022, and received positive reviews from critics.

Overview 
And FInally is a memoir by neurosurgeon and author Henry Marsh which details his battle against cancer. Marsh discusses his transition from doctor to patient, contemplates philosophical questions relating to death and the nature of the mind, and reflects on his life.

Development and writing

Publication history 
And Finally was published in the United Kingdom by Jonathan Cape on September 1, 2022. It was published in the United States by St. Martin's Press on January 17, 2023.

Reception 
And Finally was widely lauded by critics. British publications praised the book upon its release in the United Kingdom, with The Guardian's Colin Grant praising Marsh's candid discussion of death and described his prose as "plain-speaking without being dispassionate." Melanie Reid similarly praised Marsh's prose in The Times. Gillian Tindall wrote a positive review for The Times Literary Supplement in which she commented on Marsh's angst as reflected in his writing.

American publications offered similar praise for And Finally upon its stateside release. Kieran Setiya wrote a positive review for The New York Times Book Review, commenting positively on the narrative and appreciating that Marsh "does not pretend to answer metaphysical questions." The Washington Post's Abraham Verghese described the book as "thought-provoking" and a review in The Boston Globe praised Marsh's emotional language.

Positive reviews were published in Publishers Weekly and Kirkus Reviews, with the former describing Marsh's writing as "immersive" and the latter calling it a "fascinating account." Booklist's Tony Miksanek praised the memoir's structure and descriptions of dementia, and positive reviews were published in The Star Tribune and Air Mail.

References

External links 
 And Finally on BookMarks

Jonathan Cape books
English non-fiction books
2022 non-fiction books
Memoirs